The 1996 Eastern Illinois Panthers football team represented Eastern Illinois University as a member of the Ohio Valley Conference (OVC) during the 1996 NCAA Division I-AA football season. Led by tenth-year head coach Bob Spoo, the Panthers compiled and overall record of 8–4 with a mark of 6–2 in conference play, tying for second place in the OVC.

Schedule

References

Eastern Illinois
Eastern Illinois Panthers football seasons
Eastern Illinois Panthers football